Route 328 is a short collector road in the Canadian province of Nova Scotia.

It is located in the Halifax Regional Municipality and connects Lake Major at exit 6 of Highway 107/Trunk 7 with Upper Lawrencetown at Route 207 via Ross Road.

Communities
Upper Lawrencetown
Lake Major

See also
List of Nova Scotia provincial highways

References

External links
Map of Nova Scotia
 Satellite View of Ross Road

Nova Scotia provincial highways
Roads in Halifax, Nova Scotia